The Iron Behind the Velvet is an album recorded by Christy Moore in 1978, after the first breakup of Planxty. It was produced jointly by Brian Masterson and Moore, and recorded and mixed at Lombard and Keystone Studios, Dublin.

It features his brother Barry Moore (Luka Bloom) on guitar & vocals, as well as Planxty's Andy Irvine on mandolin, bouzouki, vocals and more. Also appearing are Noel Hill on concertinas, Tony Linnane on fiddle, Gabriel McKeon on Uilleann pipes, Jimmy Faulkner on guitars and Rosemary Flanagan on cello.

The final track on the present CD, "John O'Dreams", was produced by Dónal Lunny and recorded at Windmill Lane Studios in 1980; therefore, it did not originally feature on the 33rpm, vinyl LP version of The Iron Behind the Velvet.

Instead, the song was first released—under the title "John of Dreams"—on the compilation album High Kings of Tara, then subsequently re-released on the CD version of The Iron Behind the Velvet. Lunny (bouzouki, synthesizer) and Jolyon Jackson (cello, synthesizer) accompanied Moore (vocals, guitar) on the recording of this track.

Track listing 
All tracks composed by Christy Moore; except where indicated
 "Patrick was a Gentleman / Irvine's Polka (Walls of Limerick)" (Andy Irvine, Christy Moore)
 "The Sun is Burning" (Ian Campbell)
 "Morrissey and the Russian Sailor" (Traditional; arranged by Christy Moore)
 "The Foxy Devil" ('Galway Joe' Dolan)
 "Three Reels: The Newly Mowed Meadow / Farrell O'Gara's Reel / No Name Reel" (Traditional)
 "Trip to Jerusalem ('Galway Joe' Dolan) / The Mullingar Races / The Crooked Road"
 "Three Reels: Tommy Coen's / The Youngest Daughter / Flax in Bloom" (Tommy Coen/Traditional/Traditional)
 "Patrick's Arrival"
 "Gabriel McKeon's: Cailin Deas Cruaite na mBo / Gilbert Clancy's " (Traditional)
 "Dunlavin Green"
 "Joe McCann" (Éamonn O'Doherty)
 "John O'Dreams" (Bill Caddick) (*)

(*) Bonus track, first released on the 1980 compilation album High Kings of Tara and subsequently added to the CD version of The Iron Behind the Velvet.

Personnel 
 Christy Moore – vocals, guitar, bouzouki, bodhrán
 Andy Irvine – mandolin, harmonica, waldzither, dulcimer, bouzouki and vocals
 Barry Moore (Luka Bloom) – guitar and vocals
 Noel Hill – concertinas (C/G and Bb/F systems)
 Tony Linnane – fiddle
 Gabriel McKeon – Uilleann pipes (concert set and C set)
 Jimmy Faulkner – electric, acoustic and slide guitars
 Rosemary Flanagan – cello
 Dónal Lunny – guitar and synthesizer (on "John O'Dreams")
 Jolyon Jackson – cello and synthesizer (on "John O'Dreams")

References

External links 
 Record Label Catalogue 2009
 Album Sleevenotes

Christy Moore albums
1978 albums